L.A. Matheson Secondary School is a public secondary school in Surrey, British Columbia, Canada, and is part of School District 36 Surrey. Laughlin Alexander "Lockie" Matheson was a popular principal and well-respected School Superintendent. The school opened in 1969 as a junior secondary school as a feeder to Queen Elizabeth Secondary School but in 1998 became a full secondary school serving grades 8 through 12. In the 2013/14 school year, it was ranked 161st out of 316th in the annual ranking of secondary schools in British Columbia and Yukon.

Academics 
In the 2015/16 school year, L.A. Matheson Secondary School was ranked 269th out of 293 in the Fraser Institute annual ranking of secondary schools in British Columbia and Yukon.

Athletics
Sports and athletic activities are governed by the Surrey Secondary Schools' Athletic Association. The athletics program includes rugby, volleyball, soccer, swimming, boys' and girls' basketball, cross-country, running and cricket.

Fine Arts
As a member of the Surrey Drama Teachers Association and the Association of British Columbia Drama Educators, this school has an arts program including a Theatre Company, which has performed such plays as "Lockdown" by Douglas Craven, "Beauty & the Beast" by Vera Morris, and will perform their first musical in May of 2015. They have a Dance program that performs annual recitals including genres of Jazz, Tap and Hip Hop. The Band Program has performed world wide including Germany, the United States, and Cuba.

Notable alumni 
 Brenden Dillon - professional ice hockey player for the San Jose Sharks
 Jacob Hoggard - singer and songwriter for Hedley 
 Neeru Bajwa - Actress
 Ernie Jackson - Stunts | Actor

Robotics program 
In 2017 LA Matheson started a FIRST Robotics Competition team. FIRST (For Inspiration and Recognition of Science and Technology) is an international organization that inspires students from all around the world to explore careers in fields of STEM (Science, Technology, Engineering and Math). The students work with industry mentors to design, build, program and drive a robot that is able to compete in different challenges. The team has competed in both Canada and USA.

References

External links 
L.A. Matheson Secondary School
School Data Summary 2001/02 - 2005/06, British Columbia Ministry of Education.

High schools in Surrey, British Columbia
Educational institutions established in 1969
1969 establishments in British Columbia